Russula mukteshwarica is a mushroom closely related to R. violeipes. It has a purple planoconvex cap 65–130 mm in diameter, and gills that are yellow to yellow-green. The type specimen was collected from a forested region in Uttaranchand State in northern India.

See also
List of Russula species

References

External links

mukteshwarica
Fungi described in 2006
Fungi of Asia